The 14th Cabinet of North Korea was elected by the 1st Session of the 14th Supreme People's Assembly on 11 April 2019.

Members

1st SPA session (2019–21)

4th SPA Session (2021–percent)

References

Citations

Bibliography
Books:
 

14th Supreme People's Assembly
Cabinet of North Korea
2019 disestablishments in North Korea
Cabinets established in 2019
Current governments